Rhagovelia grandis is a species of aquatic bug first found in Quebrada Caparrosa, Oporapa, Huila, Colombia.

References

Further reading
 Tatiana, Parra-Trujillo Yessica, Dora Nancy Padilla Gil, and Gladys Reinoso-Flórez. "DIVERSIDAD Y DISTRIBUCIÓN DE Rhagovelia (HEMIPTERA, VELIIDAE) DEL DEPARTAMENTO DEL TOLIMA." Magazine of the Colombian Association of Biological Sciences (ACCB) 26 (2014).

Veliidae
Hemiptera of South America
Insects described in 2011